The 9th Infantry Division ("The Lightning Division") is a formation of the Bangladesh Army, based in Savar. It is the first infantry division of the Bangladesh Army that was raised post-Independence.

The division is considered the most strategic and important formation of the Bangladesh Army, as it is entrusted with the security of Dhaka, the capital of Bangladesh.

History 

9th Infantry Division was raised on 20 November 1976  in Dhaka Cantonment as the first division of the Bangladesh Army. The division started under the command of Major General Mir Shawkat Ali, headquartered at Sher-e-Bangla Nagor in Dhaka. At first, the division had 77th Infantry Brigade, 81st Infantry Brigade and 29th East Bengal Regiment under its command. During this time the 77th Infantry Brigade was made up of 9th East Bengal Regiment, 13th East Bengal Regiment and 28th East Bengal Regiment; and the 81st Infantry Brigade contained 8th East Bengal Regiment, 11th East Bengal Regiment and 27th East Bengal Regiment. The division completed its organisational structure with the induction of 9th Artillery Brigade on 22 March 1976.

On 31 May 1984, the divisional headquarters was permanently moved to Savar Cantonment. On 1 September 1984, 309th infantry brigade was raised under this division and 71st infantry brigade was added on 30 June 1992. At that time, Savar Cantonment, Ghatail Cantonment and Momenshahi Cantonment were under 9th Infantry division but on 1 July 1992, the Ghatail and Momenshahi cantonments, along with 309 Infantry brigade and 77 Infantry brigade, were transferred to the then newly formed 19th Infantry Division.

On 20 September 2013, 99th Composite Brigade was added to the division, made up of 58th East Bengal Regiment, 34th Bangladesh Infantry Regiment and 20th Engineering Construction Battalion to provide security and support during the construction of Padma Bridge.

Formation 
Under the division there is one infantry brigade, one mechanized brigade, one artillery brigade, and one composite brigade.

Combat Arms
 Cavalry:
 12 Bangal Lancer
 Infantry:
 5 Bangladesh Infantry Regiment (Support Battalion)
 71 Mechanized Brigade 
 11 Bangladesh Infantry Regiment (Mechanized)
 15 East Bangal Regiment (Mechanized)
 18 East Bangal Regiment (Mechanized)
 81 Infantry Brigade
 8 Bangladesh Infantry Regiment
 60 East Bengal Regiment
 Infantry Battalion
 99 Composite Brigade (Padma Cantonment)
 58 East Bengal Regiment
 18 Bangladesh Infantry Regiment
 Riverine Engineer Battalion
 Regiment of Artillery
 9 Artillery Brigade
 7 Field Regiment Artillery
 14 Field Regiment Artillery
 45 MLRS Regiment Artillery
 51 MLRS Regiment Artillery
 39 Division locating battery Artillery

Combat support
 Engineer
 8 Engineer Battalion
 Signals
 7 Signal Battalion
 Static Signal Company

Service
 33 Supply & Transport Battalion
 11 Field Ambulance
 9 Military Police Unit
 9 Field Intelligence Unit
 EME Workshop Savar
 Combined Military Hospital, Savar
 Military Dental Center, Savar

References 

Infantry divisions of Bangladesh
Military units and formations established in 1976